The Battle of Udgir occurred on 3 February 1760 in Udgir between Maratha Empire and the Nizam of Hyderabad.

The Marathas under the command of Sadashivrao Bhau defeated the army of  Salabat Jung (brother of Nizam Ali Khan, Asaf Jah II); wherein Salabat had intended to take the position as the Nizam. This followed by recalling of French governor Marquis de Bussy-Castelnau to Pondicherry in 1760, wherein Nizam Ali, Asaf Jah II was handed over complete power from his brother Salabat Jung who wanted to take the position as 2nd Nizam.

The aftermath of the war resulted in the Nizam's forces surrendering territory worth 60 lakhs including the cities of Ahmadnagar, Daultabad, Burhanpur and Bijapur.

Following the battle, the Marathas turned North to combat an Afghan force led by Ahmed Shah Durrani at the Third Battle of Panipat.

See also
 Battle of Palkhed

References

Conflicts in 1760
1760 in India
Battles of the Seven Years' War
Battles involving the Maratha Empire